Dicranostyles is a genus of flowering plants belonging to the family Convolvulaceae.

Its native range is Central and Southern Tropical America.

Species:

Dicranostyles ampla 
Dicranostyles costanensis 
Dicranostyles densa 
Dicranostyles falconiana 
Dicranostyles globostigma 
Dicranostyles guianensis 
Dicranostyles holostyla 
Dicranostyles integra 
Dicranostyles laxa 
Dicranostyles longifolia 
Dicranostyles mildbraediana 
Dicranostyles scandens 
Dicranostyles sericea 
Dicranostyles solimoesensis 
Dicranostyles villosa

References

Convolvulaceae
Convolvulaceae genera